Upper Street were a UK boy band formed in 2006 from the MTV-produced reality television series Totally Boyband. The members of the band were all ex-members of other groups. They were Dane Bowers of Another Level, Jimmy Constable of 911, Bradley McIntosh of S Club 7, and Danny Wood of New Kids on the Block. Lee Latchford-Evans of Steps was also originally in the line-up, but left due to conflict within the group. Their only single, "The One" was released in the United Kingdom on 23 October 2006 by Concept Records.

Despite the band's confidence that it would place in the top 10, the single entered the charts on 29 October 2006, at number 35. Teletext's Planet Sound reported on 6 November 2006, that the band had split up after confrontation with their record company.

Discography
Singles

References

External links
 Upper Street official site
 Totally Boyband at MTV.co.uk
 Concept Records website

Pop music supergroups
British supergroups
English boy bands
English pop music groups
Vocal quintets
Musical groups established in 2006
Musical groups disestablished in 2006